Notus High School is a high school in Notus, Idaho.

References

Public high schools in Idaho
Schools in Canyon County, Idaho
Public middle schools in Idaho